Mount Appleton is a  double summit mountain located in the Olympic Mountains, in Clallam County of Washington state. It is set within Olympic National Park and is situated northwest of Appleton Pass. Its nearest higher peak is South Appleton (6100+ ft),  to the south. Precipitation runoff from Mount Appleton drains into the Sol Duc River, and Boulder Creek which is a tributary of the Elwha River, thence into the Strait of Juan de Fuca.

History

Mount Appleton was so named to honor Dr. T. J. Appleton, who moved to Port Angeles, Washington, from the state of Michigan, circa 1897. He was a pioneering physician who made house calls in some of the most rural parts of Clallam County and was the first white doctor to treat Native Americans in this area. Appleton was also an eloquent speaker and published author. Later he was a three-term mayor of Port Angeles before he died in 1942.

The first ascent of the mountain is unknown.

Climate

Set in the northwest portion of the Olympic Mountains, Mount Appleton is located in the marine west coast climate zone of western North America.  Most weather fronts originate in the Pacific Ocean, and travel northeast toward the Olympic Mountains. As fronts approach, they are forced upward by the peaks of the Olympic Range, causing them to drop their moisture in the form of rain or snowfall (Orographic lift). As a result, the Olympics experience high precipitation, especially during the winter months in the form of snowfall.  During winter months, weather is usually cloudy, but, due to high pressure systems over the Pacific Ocean that intensify during summer months, there is often little or no cloud cover during the summer. Because of maritime influence, snow tends to be wet and heavy, resulting in high avalanche danger.

Geology

The Olympic Mountains are composed of obducted clastic wedge material and oceanic crust, primarily Eocene sandstone, turbidite, and basaltic oceanic crust. The mountains were sculpted during the Pleistocene era by erosion and glaciers advancing and retreating multiple times.

See also

 Olympic Mountains
 Geology of the Pacific Northwest
 Geography of Washington (state)

References

External links
 
 Weather: Mount Appleton

Mountains of Washington (state)
Olympic Mountains
Mountains of Clallam County, Washington
Landforms of Olympic National Park
North American 1000 m summits